Langoiran is a commune in the Gironde department in Nouvelle-Aquitaine in southwestern France.

Population

Personalities
It is the birthplace of French footballer Alain Giresse who played in the 1986 World Cup.

See also
Communes of the Gironde department

References

External links

Castle of Langoiran

Communes of Gironde